Tsaghkashat (also romanized as Tsakhkashat; formerly, Khachidur) is a town in the Lori Province of Armenia.

References 
 
 

Populated places in Lori Province